Alex Belfield (born ) is an English former radio presenter for BBC Radio Leeds who was dismissed for misconduct. Belfield went on to claim online fame through YouTube amassing a large listener audience for his right-wing views of current social issues.

Belfield's career began in radio in the Midlands but was terminated due to his behaviour towards BBC colleagues. Belfield went on to create his own online show called The Voice of Reason on YouTube to promote his anti-establishment and right-wing ideology.

Belfield was convicted of stalking charges in September 2022. His YouTube channel remains live as of February 2023.

Career
Belfield's career began as an entertainer in Nottingham at the age of 14. His career has spanned television, radio and print. He was responsible for stories on the front pages of The Sun, the Daily Mirror and the Daily Express. He worked at Mansfield 103.2 FM in the early 2000s. He presented the mid-morning show on BBC Radio Leeds. In 2010 he made lewd comments about weather presenter Keeley Donovan's broadcasts at home that resulted in complaints from listeners. As punishment, Belfield was suspended from the station for a day and strongly reprimanded by BBC bosses. He later described his time at Radio Leeds as "the worst year of my life".

Belfield went on to claim online fame through his YouTube channel called The Voice of Reason. He amassed a large listener audience for his right-wing views of current social issues. He used the channel to promote his anti-establishment and right-wing ideology, broadcasting from home in the Mapperley area of Nottingham.

In a video on 22 March 2021 he said he had been living through hell for the past year and a half. He said that a witch-hunt against him had been orchestrated by the BBC in collusion with Nottinghamshire Police. He claimed he had been arrested four times and had had his house raided twice without a warrant.

Stalking charges
On 18 June 2021 Belfield was summonsed to appear at Nottingham Magistrates' Court, where he was charged with 12 counts of stalking "involving fear of violence or serious alarm or distress" on 1 July. On 29 July he appeared at Nottingham Crown Court and was alleged to have stalked eight people between November 2012 and March 2021, including BBC staff members Stephanie Hirst and Jeremy Vine. He denied all charges and was released on conditional bail. He appeared at the Crown Court on 4 November for a case management hearing and stood trial on 4 July 2022.

Trial and conviction
Belfield was convicted in September 2022 for four of eight stalking charges at Nottingham Crown Court. His YouTube channel remains live. He was sentenced to five and a half years in prison; before sentencing "he was allowed to deliver a pompous closing speech deriding the case as a 'BBC and police witch-hunt' and describing himself as 'the No 1 anti-BBC journalist'. 'I am offensive... My human right allows me to speak words that are not to everyone's taste,' he told the jury." The judge noted that while Belfield acknowledged the distress he caused the victims, he showed more concern during the proceedings about being treated unfairly and how the process impacted him (Belfield) personally.

References 

Year of birth missing (living people)
Living people
BBC radio presenters
English radio presenters
British male journalists
21st-century British journalists
British newspaper journalists
People from Nottingham